Barbara (minor planet designation: 234 Barbara) is a main belt asteroid that was discovered by German-American astronomer Christian Heinrich Friedrich Peters on August 12, 1883, in Clinton, New York. The orbital plane is inclined by 15.37° to the plane of the ecliptic. It is classified as a stony S-type asteroid based upon its spectrum. The mean diameter of this object is estimated as 45.6 km. It has a rotation rate of 26.5 hours, or a little over a day. It is possibly named for Saint Barbara, patron saint of mathematicians.

Observations of light curves and stellar occultations suggest the surface exhibits large concave areas. Polarimetric study of this asteroid reveals anomalous properties that suggests the regolith consists of a mixture of low and high albedo material. This may have been caused by fragmentation of an asteroid substrate with the spectral properties of CO3/CV3 carbonaceous chondrites. It is the prototype for a class of asteroids called "Barbarians" that display a strong infrared absorption band at 2μm, which is a characteristic of an FeO–enriched spinel mineral. Multiple other examples of this class have since been discovered.

Observations made in 2009 with ESO's Very Large Telescope Interferometer (VLTI) suggested that 234 Barbara may be a binary asteroid, although a paper published in 2015 states that "the VLTI observations can be explained without the presence of a large satellite".

References

External links
 The Asteroid Orbital Elements Database
 Minor Planet Discovery Circumstances
 Asteroid Lightcurve Data File
 
 

S-type asteroids (Tholen)
Ld-type asteroids (SMASS)
Background asteroids
Barbara
Barbara
18830812